The Alice Faye Collection is a DVD box set with four movies of the famous 1930s and 1940s film star Alice Faye.

It is part of the 20th Century Fox Marquee Musicals, that refers to a collection of films released on DVD by Twentieth Century-Fox.

Background 
In December 2007, Fox Home Entertainment have announced the release of "The Alice Faye Collection" for February 20, 2007 as part of their 20th Century Fox Marquee Musicals series of releases.

Films

Reception 
The New York Times says, "20th Century Fox Home Entertainment has been turning out some first-rate discs lately, but something has gone horribly wrong with “The Alice Faye Collection,”. San Diego Reader wrote that "The Alice Faye Collection has four of the great Fox musical star's best films: On the Avenue, Lillian Russell, That Night in Rio, and The Gang's All Here. My favorites are the last two because they are brightened by the Brazilian bombshell Carmen Miranda. Miss Faye exuded the charm and innocence our boys were fighting for in World War II."

References

External links
 The Alice Faye Collection on Amazon.com

American film series